Gao Jian may refer to:

 Gao Jian (footballer, born 1982), Chinese football player
 Gao Jian (footballer, born 2002), Chinese football player
 Gao Jian (diplomat), People's Republic of China Ambassador to Hungary